Catherine Anna McKenna (August 30, 1875 – ?) was a US lawyer. In 1912, she was the first woman to be admitted to practice law in California since the passage of the suffrage amendment. She also served on the Supreme Court of California, Supreme Court of Wyoming, and the District Court of the United States.

Early years and education
Catherine Anna Hickey was born in Taunton, Massachusetts in 1875. She was the daughter of James and Hannah (Mahoney) Hickey. She attended public schools in Colorado, and graduated from State Normal School at Greeley, Colorado, in 1896.

Career
McKenna taught school for five years after her graduation. She resided in Colorado and Montana before coming to Los Angeles, California in 1902. She married John Irving McKenna in 1906. She studied law under J. Irving McKenna, and was admitted to the bar of California by the Supreme Court on January 17, 1912. McKenna, who specialized in land titles, maintained offices at 440 Wilcox Building, Los Angeles. She was a member of Woman's Lawyers Association, Woman Lawyers Club, Women's City Club, Professional Women's Club, Bar Association, National Woman's Party, as well as the Business and Professional Women's Association.

References

Bibliography
 
 

1875 births
Year of death missing
People from Taunton, Massachusetts
California lawyers
American women lawyers
Schoolteachers from Colorado
American women educators